The Analyst is a book by George Berkeley

The Analyst may also refer to:
 The Analyst, former title of the chemical journal Analyst, published by the Royal Society of Chemistry
 The Analyst, or, Mathematical Museum, a mathematics journal
 The Analyst, the first name of the Annals of Mathematics, a mathematics journal
 The Analyst (newspaper), a newspaper in Liberia
 The Analyst (novel), a novel by John Katzenbach
 "The Analyst", a song on the album Mistaken Identity by Delta Goodrem

See also
 Analyst (disambiguation)